Luc Mathieu (born 1974) is a French journalist. He has been working as a reporter for Libération since 2011.

In 2015, Matthieu was awarded the Albert Londres Prize for his series of articles on the jihad he made in Syria, Kurdistan and Iraq.

References

External links 
 Le prix Albert-Londres pour Luc Mathieu de Libération on Libération (30 May 2015)
 Luc Matthieu on France Culture
 Le prix Albert Londres décerné à Luc Mathieu on Le Figaro (30 May 2015)
 Ses reportages sur "grandsreporters.com"

21st-century French journalists
Albert Londres Prize recipients
1974 births
Living people